The Sedgwick County Extension Arboretum is located in Sedgwick County, Kansas, United States at 7001 W. 21st North Wichita, Kansas. It was established in 1994 and formally dedicated on Thursday, October 23, 2003.

The Arboretum currently contains 195 trees, representing 97 species adapted to south central Kansas. Each is marked with its name.

External links
Sedgwick County Extension Arboretum

See also 
 List of botanical gardens in the United States

Arboreta in Kansas
Botanical gardens in Kansas
Geography of Wichita, Kansas
Culture of Wichita, Kansas
Tourist attractions in Wichita, Kansas
Protected areas of Sedgwick County, Kansas